John A. Johnson may refer to:
John Johnson (astronomer), Harvard professor
John Albert Johnson, Minnesota governor
John Alvin Johnson (1915–2005), U.S. lawyer and businessman
John A. Johnson (Minnesota politician), Minnesota state legislator
John Anders Johnson, member of the Wisconsin State Assembly
Jack Johnson (boxer) (John Arthur Johnson), boxer

See also
John Johnson (disambiguation)